Poland competed at the 1993 World Championships in Athletics in Stuttgart, Germany, from 13 – 22 August 1993.

Medalists

Sources 

Nations at the 1993 World Championships in Athletics
World Championships in Athletics
Poland at the World Championships in Athletics